National Metal and Materials Technology Center (MTEC) is one of Thailand's National Research Centers. It is directed by the National Science and Technology Development Agency (NSTDA), which belongs to Ministry of Higher Education, Science, Research and Innovation. A publicly funded governmental organization, MTEC enjoys more freedom in its operation than government-only bodies. MTEC aims to promote, support and coordinate research and development in polymers, metals, ceramics, and related materials, and to encourage collaborations among research, education and technology organizations.

References

External links 
 2015 MTEC review: 

Research institutes in Thailand
National Science and Technology Development Agency